The 2018 FC Ordabasy season is the 16th successive season that the club will play in the Kazakhstan Premier League, the highest tier of association football in Kazakhstan. Ordabasy will also participate in the Kazakhstan Cup and the Europa League.

Season events
On 11 January 2018, Georgi Dermendzhiev was appointed as the new manager of Ordabasy.

After finishing the previous season in third position, Ordabasy would have qualified for the Europa League first qualifying round but they failed to obtain a UEFA licence.

Squad

On Loan

Transfers

Winter

In:

Out:

Summer

In:

Out:

Released

Friendlies

Competitions

Premier League

Results summary

Results by round

Results

League table

Kazakhstan Cup

Squad statistics

Appearances and goals

|-
|colspan="14"|Players away from Ordabasy on loan:
|-
|colspan="14"|Players who left Ordabasy during the season:

|}

Goal scorers

Disciplinary record

References

External links
Official Website

FC Ordabasy seasons
Ordabasy